The 1905 UCI Track Cycling World Championships were the World Championship for track cycling. They took place in Antwerp, Belgium from 16 to 23 July 1905. Four events for men were contested, two for professionals and two for amateurs.

Medal summary

Medal table

References

Track cycling
UCI Track Cycling World Championships by year
International cycle races hosted by Belgium
Sports competitions in Antwerp
UCI  World Championships
UCI Track Cycling World Championships
1900s in Antwerp